Aigul Japarova (Kyrgyz: Айгүл Жапарова, née Asanbaeva), as the wife of President Sadyr Japarov, is the incumbent First Lady of Kyrgyzstan. She is five years his junior.

Biography
She was born in a village in the Tüp District in 1973. She studied at a medical school, then received a higher education at the Arabaev Kyrgyz State University. Asanbayeva lived with her children abroad for three years during her husband's exile, mainly in Poland and Russia. In an interview, she claimed that she turned to President Almazbek Atambayev's wife, Raisa, for help, when her husband and son were detained by the security forces at the Kyrgyz border. She and Japarov are the parents of four children, one of whom died on 26 August 2019 in an accident.

Tenure as First Lady
During her husband's acting presidency, she volunteered to help volunteers in the fight against the COVID-19 pandemic in Kyrgyzstan. In June 2021, she joined her husband on his official visit to Turkey in her first such foreign trip.

Perception
She has been compared to Mayram Akayeva, the wife of the first president Askar Akayev. It has also been noted that her father has been working at the Kumtor Gold Mine for many years, a place which Japarov for many years has advocated for its nationalization.

References 

Living people
1973 births
First ladies and gentlemen of Kyrgyzstan
People from Issyk-Kul Region
21st-century Kyrgyzstani women politicians
21st-century Kyrgyzstani politicians